Ger O'Driscoll was a Gaelic footballer from Valentia Island, County Kerry. He played at senior level for the Kerry county team between 1975 and 1980. He also played for his local Young Islanders club.

References

Year of birth missing (living people)
Living people
Kerry inter-county Gaelic footballers
Valentia Young Islanders Gaelic footballers
Winners of two All-Ireland medals (Gaelic football)